Glounthaune railway station is an Iarnród Éireann station serving the town of Glounthaune in County Cork, Ireland. The station is at is the junction between Cobh and Midleton on the Cork Commuter line.

History
The station opened on 10 November 1859 by the Cork, Youghal & Queenstown Railway, with services initially only running onwards to Youghal. On 10 March 1862, passenger services began running to Cobh from the junction as well. The line onward to Midleton and Youghal closed to passenger services in 1963 before re-opening again in August 2009 as far as Midleton The station was originally called "Cobh Junction" and was renamed "Glounthaune" in 1994; tickets issued from Iarnród Éireann portable ticket machines still print the station name as "Cobh Jct".

Services
The station is unstaffed, with two ticket machines near the entrance in the carpark and two leap card validators (one at the entrance and the other on the platform). There are two platforms serving the double track. Platform 1 is on the near side and is fully wheelchair accessible with eastbound trains from Cork to Cobh and Midleton. There is a footbridge to bring passengers from platform 1 to platform 2 meaning there is no wheelchair access to platform 2 and the westbound trains running to Little Island and Cork city. As of 2020, Cork County Council published plans to add more parking spaces (48 as of January 2020) and to improve accessibility to bicycles and improve onward bus connections in the 2020s.

With around 40 trains per day in each direction, this is a frequent commuter station with four trains per hour running into Cork city at peak time on weekdays and twice per hour (1 from Cobh and 1 from Midleton) off peak. Travel time to Cork:11 minutes, Midleton:13 minutes and Cobh:14 minutes. The station is usually served by IE 2600 Class diesel trains in 2 or 4 carriage setups.

Under the Cork metropolitan area transport strategy, published in 2019, it was planned to increase services to the station and potentially electrify the line by approximately 2040.

Gallery

References

External links
Glounthane Station on IrishRail.ie 

Iarnród Éireann stations in County Cork
Railway stations in County Cork
Railway stations opened in 2009